Sergio Sánchez Ortega (born 3 April 1986) is a Spanish former professional footballer who played as either a right-back or a central defender.

He amassed La Liga totals of 168 games and three goals over the course of 12 seasons, representing Espanyol, Racing de Santander, Sevilla and Málaga in the competition. He won one Copa del Rey with the third club.

Club career

Espanyol
Born in Mataró, Barcelona, Catalonia, Sánchez was a product of RCD Espanyol's youth system. He made his debut for the first team on 24 April 2005, playing 85 minutes from the bench in a 3–1 home win against Real Zaragoza in what was his sole appearance of the season.

Sánchez was loaned to Segunda División's Real Madrid Castilla in January 2007 and, at the end of the campaign, which ended in relegation, was loaned again, to Racing de Santander in La Liga, appearing significantly as the Cantabrian side achieved a first-ever qualification for the UEFA Cup.

In July 2008, Sánchez returned to Espanyol, scoring his first official goal for the club in a 1–1 home draw with Getafe CF on 20 September. He spent the entire season on the right flank, as the Pericos eventually avoided relegation.

Sevilla
Sánchez agreed to join Sevilla FC in July 2009 in a four-year deal worth €4 million, with an additional one million being added if the Andalusians attained certain goals. On 1 January 2010, it was announced that he would be unable to play football again until 'rigorous tests' were carried out on his heart, after he complained of pains. His season outputs consisted of seven league games – helping Sevilla to the fourth place – and two in the Copa del Rey which the club won, both legs of the clash against CF Atlético Ciudad (9–3 on aggregate).

On 18 January 2011, after more than one year out of football, Sánchez returned to active – he had already been an unused substitute the previous week against former side Espanyol – starting in a Spanish Cup match against Villarreal CF, and helping the title holders to reach the semi-finals after a 3–0 home win (6–3 on aggregate).

Málaga
On 23 June 2011, Sánchez left Sevilla and joined neighbours Málaga CF for €2.8 million, signing a four-year contract. He made his debut for his new club on 25 September, appearing as a right-back in the 0–0 draw at Zaragoza.

Sánchez opened the scoring in a Spanish Cup tie against Real Madrid on 3 January 2012, through a header in an eventual 3–2 away loss (4–2 aggregate).

Panathinaikos
On 28 June 2015, after being linked to former club Espanyol and Beşiktaş JK, the 29-year-old Sánchez moved abroad for the first time in his career and signed with Panathinaikos FC, earning a reported annual salary of €800,000 including objectives. In his debut, at home against Club Brugge KV in the third qualifying round of the UEFA Champions League, he was sent off late into the first half, but the hosts eventually came from behind with one player less to win 2–1.

Sánchez suffered an arm injury during an away game against PAS Giannina F.C. on 7 January 2016 after colliding with teammate Stefanos Kotsolis, going on to be sidelined for approximately three months.

Rubin and Espanyol
On 27 June 2016, Sánchez moved to Russia after signing with FC Rubin Kazan. On 1 September 2017, he returned to Espanyol after agreeing to a one-year loan. 

Sánchez subsequently joined the latter on a permanent deal, leaving the RCDE Stadium in August 2018.

Cádiz
On 21 September 2018, Sánchez signed a two-year contract with Cádiz CF. On 31 January 2020, after falling down the pecking order, he was loaned to fellow second division side Albacete Balompié for six months.

On 8 August 2020, despite his contract was automatically extended for a further year after Cádiz achieved promotion, Sánchez was released.

Honours
Sevilla
Copa del Rey: 2009–10

References

External links

1986 births
Living people
People from Mataró
Sportspeople from the Province of Barcelona
Spanish footballers
Footballers from Catalonia
Association football defenders
La Liga players
Segunda División players
Segunda División B players
RCD Espanyol B footballers
RCD Espanyol footballers
Real Madrid Castilla footballers
Racing de Santander players
Sevilla FC players
Málaga CF players
Cádiz CF players
Albacete Balompié players
Super League Greece players
Panathinaikos F.C. players
Russian Premier League players
FC Rubin Kazan players
Spain youth international footballers
Spain under-21 international footballers
Catalonia international footballers
Spanish expatriate footballers
Expatriate footballers in Greece
Expatriate footballers in Russia
Spanish expatriate sportspeople in Greece
Spanish expatriate sportspeople in Russia